The Piranhas River is a river of Tocantins state in central Brazil. The Piranhas joins the Araguaia River in northern Tocantins state near the municipality of Araguatins.

See also
List of rivers of Tocantins

References
Brazilian Ministry of Transport

Rivers of Tocantins